Hockey Puck Spring is a spring in Coconino County, Arizona, in the United States.

Hockey Puck is a corruption of the Hualapai.

See also
 List of rivers of Arizona

References

Bodies of water of Coconino County, Arizona
Springs of Arizona